Aurélien Cologni (born 11 February 1978 in France) is the head coach of FC Lezignan in the Elite One Championship and the French national rugby league team. Cologni is a former player, a French international who played for the Lézignan Sangliers club in France's Elite One Championship. He is the son of Jean-Jacques Cologni, who was also a rugby league player and coach.

Career

Coaching
He coached the France 9s squad at the 2019 Rugby League World Cup 9s.

Cologni was France head coach on two separate occasions.

References

External links
Lézignan Sangliers profile
SL stats

1978 births
Living people
Catalans Dragons players
Crusaders Rugby League players
France national rugby league team coaches
France national rugby league team players
French rugby league coaches
French rugby league players
Lézignan Sangliers coaches
Lézignan Sangliers players
Rugby league second-rows